WNRR (1380 kHz) is a commercial AM station licensed to North Augusta, South Carolina, and serving the Augusta metropolitan area, including sections of South Carolina and Georgia.  It is owned by the Eternity Media Group and airs an urban gospel radio format.

By day, WNRR is powered at 4,000 watts.  But to protect other stations on 1380 AM, it reduces power at night to only 70 watts.  It uses a non-directional antenna at all times.

WNRR signed on in 1958.

See also

Media in Augusta, Georgia

External links

FCC History Cards for WNRR

References

NRR
Radio stations established in 1958
Gospel radio stations in the United States
1958 establishments in Georgia (U.S. state)